KTHE may refer to:

 KJFK-FM, a radio station (96.3 FM) licensed to serve Llano, Texas, United States, which held the call sign KTHE from 2016 to 2022
 KTHE (Wyoming), a defunct radio station (1240 AM) formerly licensed to serve Thermopolis, Wyoming, United States